Younès Mégri (born November 15, 1951 in Oujda, Morocco) is a Moroccan singing artist and actor.

Beginnings
Younes Megri started singing and playing guitar at a very young age and came from a family of artists. His father played the lute and practiced painting, his mother sang in a religious music band, his brothers played the guitar and his sister was a singer. In 1960 the family moved to Rabat. He studied music at the Moroccan National Conservatory of Music in Rabat, as well as at the École Normale de Musique de Malesherbe in Paris.

As part of Les Frères Mégri
He became part of Les Frères Mégri (the Megri Brothers) singing group, made up of the three brothers, Hassan, Mahmoud and Younès Mégri, and their sister Jalila Mégri. Younès was their youngest member. In 1974, Les Frères Mégri released the album Younes et Mahmoud (Arabic: يونس و محمود مكري ) that was a collaboration between the brothers Younès and Mahmoud. The second album, released also the same year was entitled Younes, Hassan, Mahmoud (Arabic: يونس حسن محمود ) was a collaboration between all three brothers.

Solo career
As a solo artist, he had an even bigger career performing throughout the Maghreb countries and in many European capitals, achieving international success particularly in France. His biggest success was the song "Lili Twili" (translation: my night is long), which was sampled by the German band Boney M. in their song Children of "Children of Paradise". He received a Golden Record for this song, and performed at the Olympia in 1985 during his solo career.

Film career
During the 1990s, he also began to compose film music for Moroccan and international films, most notably Gabriel Axel's "Leila la pure" and "8MM" for which he worked with Michael Dana as a consultant.

After a brief role in 1980, he had a prosperous film career starting 1990s specially after the Moroccan casting director Ahmed Boulane offered him roles for Moroccan and international films, with Boulane's first feature film, "Ali, Rabia et les autres" in 2000 shooting Younès Mégri to stardom as a leading actor in Moroccan films. Mégri also played in many Moroccan television serials.

Discography

Albums
As Les Frères Mégri
1974: Younes et Mahmoud
1974: Younes, Hassan, Mahmoud
Solo

Singles
"Lili Twili"

Filmography

Actor
1995: Marie de Nazareth as a disciple of Jesus
1997: David as a foot soldier (TV movie)
1999: The Seventh Scroll as Omar (TV mini-series)
2001: Ali, Rabiaa et les autres
2003: Face à face as Redouane
2003: Ancient Egyptians as an Egyptian (TV series - episode four "The Twins Tale")
2005: The Government Inspector as General Amin (TV movie)
2006: The Moroccan Symphony as Hamid
2006: Heaven's Doors in a cameo appearance
2006: The Miracles of Jesus as an apostle (TV mini-series)
2007: The Satanic Angels as Momo's Father
2008: Amours voilées as Hamza

Music composer
1997: Voyage dans le passé (short)
1998: Les amis d'hier2001: Ali, Rabiaa et les autres2001: Drole de journée dans le desert (short)
2001: Leïla2002: The Wind Horse2003: Moi, ma mère et Bétina (TV movie)
2004: La chambre noire2007: Deux Femmes Sur La Route2010: Pour la vie''

In popular culture
His song "Lili Twili" was covered by Boney M. in their song "Children of Paradise"*The same song was also covered by French singer Maria De Rossi.

References

External links
Official website

1951 births
Living people
People from Oujda